The 1912 Wimbledon Championships took place on the outdoor grass courts at the All England Lawn Tennis and Croquet Club in Wimbledon, London, United Kingdom. The tournament ran from 24 June until 8 July. It was the 36th staging of the Wimbledon Championships, and the first Grand Slam tennis event of 1912.

Champions

Men's singles

 Anthony Wilding defeated  Arthur Gore  6–4, 6–4, 4–6, 6–4

Women's singles

 Ethel Larcombe defeated  Charlotte Sterry 6–3, 6–1

Men's doubles

 Herbert Roper Barrett /  Charles Dixon defeated  Max Decugis /  André Gobert 3–6, 6–3, 6–4, 7–5

References

External links
 Official Wimbledon Championships website

 
Wimbledon Championships
Wimbledon Championships
Wimbledon Championships
Wimbledon Championships